Matte Edgar (born 4 December 1993), better known by his stage name Eddie Wizzy,  is a Ugandan dancer and choreographer. He was nominated in the Afrimma Awards 2016 and 2017 in the African Best Dancer category.

Education 
Eddie studied at Jinja Army Primary School, Lubiri S.S.S, and Mityana.

Music career 
Wizzy started as a choreographer for Eddy Kenzo in 2015, featuring in different music videos, such as "Be happy", "Viva Africa", "Free Style Dance", "Disco Disco" by Eddy Kenzo, Sheeba's "By da way","Bukolomoni" by Cindy, "Katonda wa Raggae" by Ziza Bafana, and "Menya Egumba", featuring Ykee Benda. Wizzy recorded his first sinhke, "Dance Vs Rap", featuring Feffe Bussi, in 2016.

Discography
{| class="wikitable"
|+Songs
!Song Title
!Year
|-
|"Dance Vs Rap"
|2016
|-
|"Tabuka"
|2017
|-
|"Selfie Dance"
|2017
|-
|"Menya Egumba"
|2017
|-
|"Kamitokosita"
|2017
|-
|"Ozina Bulungi"
|2019
|-
|"Tomala Budde"
|2019
|-

References

External links
http://chano8.com/dancer-eddy-wizzy-teases-fans-with-a-broken-leg-prank/
https://bigeye.ug/eddie-wizzy-excites-revelers-filles-concert-powerful-performance/
https://bigeye.ug/eddie-wizzy-delighted-getting-nod-afrimma-awards/
https://bigeye.ug/eddie-wizzys-free-style-dance-video-goes-viral-gets-recognition-uk/
https://bigeye.ug/video-big-talents-eddie-wizzy-talks-about-his-journey-as-a-dancer/
https://www.ntv.co.ug/news/sparktvnews/Man-accuses-Eddy-Wizzy-of-kidnap/4522364-5435792-uohwpc/index.html
https://thetowerpost.com/2017/10/13/ugandas-ghetto-kids-crowned-africas-best-dancers/

1993 births
Ugandan rappers
Living people
21st-century Ugandan male singers